Highwayman is the first studio album released by country supergroup The Highwaymen, comprising Kris Kristofferson, Johnny Cash, Waylon Jennings and Willie Nelson. Highwayman, released through Columbia Records in 1985, was the group's first and most successful album.

Background
All four musicians had long been admirers of each other's work.  Cash, who got his start at Sun Records in the mid-fifties, shared an apartment with Jennings between marriages in the late sixties, a time when both Jennings and Nelson were growing weary of Nashville’s stale recording practices.  When Kristofferson emerged as a new voice for progressive country songwriting around this time, all three covered his songs, with Cash’s version of "Sunday Morning Coming Down" becoming a smash, and heralded the younger musician as a unique talent.  Jennings, Nelson, and Kristofferson would go on to enjoy immense success as part of the Outlaw movement in the seventies, with Waylon and Willie recording several albums and embarking on lucrative tours.  By the mid-eighties, Nelson remained the most relevant on the charts while the careers of the other three had lulled somewhat.  As Nelson biographer Joe Nick Patoski puts it, "The strength-in-numbers collaboration aimed to bolster the careers of four giants old enough to be regarded as legends but who were no longer considered suitable for contemporary country radio."  In his 1996 memoir Waylon, Jennings recalled:

John had brought our four personalities together initially, in Montreaux, Switzerland, in 1984.  Every year, he had a television Christmas special, and that holiday season he wanted us all to come over...We started trading songs in the hotel after we worked on the special, and someone said, like they always do, we oughta cut the album...Usually everyone goes their separate ways after that, but the idea took hold.

In contrast to his close relationship with Jennings and Kristofferson, Cash barely knew Nelson, but within days, the foursome were in a Nashville studio with Moman (who had produced Nelson's two previous albums) trying out some material.  Kristofferson later marvelled, "I always looked up to all of them and felt like I was kind of a kid who had climbed up on Mount Rushmore and stuck his face out there."

Recording and composition
Highwayman, consisting of ten tracks, was released as a follow-up to the successful single of the same name and the title track of the album itself.  "Highwayman", a Jimmy Webb cover, hit the top of the country charts and was followed up by the Top 20 hit "Desperados Waiting for a Train", whose original version was released by Guy Clark. The album was entirely produced by Chips Moman. Marty Stuart also played guitar and mandolin on the sessions.  From the first playback, there was magic in their collective voices, and with Moman's encouragement, the group, which they called The Highwaymen, assembled some other songs that spoke to the nostalgic appeal of these four veteran talents coming together.  Nelson later admitted, "You wouldn't think our four uneven voices would blend.  But they did.  They fit together like a jigsaw puzzle."  The version of "Big River" on this album is significant because it includes a Jennings-sung verse that Cash omitted from the original recording.  The album is also notable for the song "The Twentieth Century Is Almost Over," written by Steve Goodman, who had died of leukaemia the year before, and John Prine, who Kristofferson in particular had been a fan and supporter of for years.

The group wasn't named "The Highwaymen" from the beginning. On their first two albums, they are credited as "Nelson, Jennings, Cash, Kristofferson". The official name which came to be widely recognized began to be used only in later years, and their last collaborative effort, The Road Goes on Forever, was already credited to "The Highwaymen".

Critical reception

Robert Huffman Rated the album 5 out of 5 stars. According to MNN news network. Robert was quoted by Nancy Wolfe saying "I can't stop listening to this album" 
Also rating it 4 out of 5 stars, William Ruhlmann of Allmusic wrote that "the rest of the record...lives up to the leadoff hit."  Kristofferson biographer Stephen Miller writes, "At times Highwayman sounded over-produced, not least because of the occasional presence of synthesizers, and while it had a definite country feel, at times it leant towards an AOR style."

Track listing

Charts

Weekly charts

Year-end charts

Certifications

Personnel
From Highwayman liner notes.

The Highwaymen
 Johnny Cash - vocals
 Waylon Jennings - vocals, guitar
 Willie Nelson - vocals, guitar
 Kris Kristofferson - vocals

Musicians
 J. R. Cobb - guitars
 Gene Chrisman - drums
 Paul Davis - keyboards, background vocals
 Bobby Emmons - keyboards
 Mike Leech - bass guitar
 Chips Moman - guitars, background vocals
 Mickey Raphael - harmonica
 Johnny Rodriguez - background vocals
 Marty Stuart - guitar, mandolin
 Jimmy Tittle - bass guitar
 Bobby Wood - keyboards
 Reggie Young - guitars

Technical
 David Cherry - engineering
 Ken Criblez - assistant engineer
 Larry Greenhill - assistant engineer
 Chips Moman - producer, engineering
 Denny Purcell - mastering

References

Bibliography

1985 debut albums
Columbia Records albums
Albums produced by Chips Moman
The Highwaymen (country supergroup) albums